Lizard orchid, Himantoglossum hircinum, is a species of orchid found across Europe.

Lizard orchid may also refer to:
Burnettia cuneata, found in Australia
Himantoglossum adriaticum, Adriatic lizard orchid